The following is a list of notable deaths in January 1996.

Entries for each day are listed alphabetically by surname. A typical entry lists information in the following sequence:
 Name, age, country of citizenship at birth, subsequent country of citizenship (if applicable), reason for notability, cause of death (if known), and reference.

January 1996

1
Arleigh Burke, 94, United States Navy admiral.
Dori Dorika, 82, Russian-Italian  actress.
Alifa Rifaat, 65, Egyptian author.
Arthur Rudolph, 89, German rocket engineer.
Jessie Vihrog, 89, South African-born German film actress.
Virgil W. Vogel, 76, American television and film director.
Sergei Yakovlev, 70, Soviet/Russian actor.

2
Michel Berto, 46, French actor.
Viatcheslav Nazarov, 43, Russian musician, traffic collision.
Karl Rappan, 90, Austrian football player and coach.

Julià Reig Ribó, 84, Andorran politician. 

Efua Theodora Sutherland, 71, Ghanaian writer.

3
Aníbal Pinto Santa Cruz, 76-77, Chilean economist, heart attack.
Terence Cuneo, 88, British artist.
Paul Lipson, 82, American stage actor.
Connie Ryan, 75, American baseball player and coach.
Ričardas Vaitkevičius, 62, Soviet/Lithuanian rower and Olympian.

4
Anna Amalie Abert, 89, German musicologist.
Tino Bianchi, 90, Italian actor, pneumonia.
Jean Feyte, 92, French film editor.
Bob Flanagan, 43, American writer, performance artist, poet, musician, and comic, cystic fibrosis.
Zhou Mingzhen, 77, Chinese paleontologist.
Steve Raines, 79, American actor (Rawhide).
Ramón Vinay, 84, Chilean opera singer.

5
Yahya Ayyash, 29, Palestinian  chief bombmaker of Hamas, homicide.
Gus Bivona, 80, American musician.
Václav David, 85, Czechoslovak politician.
Lincoln Kirstein, 88, American writer, impresario, art connoisseur, and philanthropist.
Knut Løfsnes, 77, Norwegian resistance member during World War II and politician.
Thung Sin Nio, 93, Indonesian-Dutch women's rights activist, physician, economist and politician.
Elmer Singleton, 77, American baseball player.

6
Henry Hopkinson, 1st Baron Colyton, 94, British politician.
Jan Willem de Pous, 75, Dutch politician and economist.
William J. Dyess, 66, American diplomat, cancer.
Duane Hanson, 70, American sculptor.
Johnnie Johnston, 80, American actor and singer.
Maude Kegg, 91, American Ojibwe traditionalist, bead artist, and author.
John Philipps Kenyon, 68, British historian.
Kim Kwang-seok, 31, South Korean musician, suicide.
Kurt Schmücker, 76, German politician.
Chubby Wise, 80, American bluegrass fiddler.

7
William H. Clothier, 92, American cinematographer.
John A. Gronouski, 76, American diplomat.
Károly Grósz, 65, Hungarian politician, kidney cancer.
V. Kumar, 61, India film score composer.
Seton Lloyd, 93, British archaeologist.
Harold Norman Moldenke, 86, American botanist and taxonomist.
Tarō Okamoto, 84, Japanese artist, art theorist, and writer, Parkinson's disease.
Bienvenido Santos, 84, Filipino writer.
Heinrich Scheel, 80, German historian of modern age.
Aaron Stell, 84, American film and television editor.

8
Paul Cleary, 73, American gridiron football player.
Carmen Conde, 88, Spanish poet, novelist, literary critic, Alzheimer's disease.
Teobaldo Depetrini, 81, Italian football player and coach.
John Hargreaves, 50, Australian actor, AIDS-related complications.
Fernand Leblanc, 78, Canadian politician.
Joyce McCartan, 65, Northern Irish community worker and peace activist.
Norrie McCathie, 34, Scottish football player, carbon monoxide poisoning.
Michiya Mihashi, 65, Japanese singer, multiple organ dysfunction syndrome.
Harlan Mills, 76, American computer scientist and academic.
François Mitterrand, 79, French statesman and President of France, prostate cancer.
Howard Taubman, 88, American theatre critic.
Paul Vialar, 97, French writer.
Sadao Watanabe, 83, Japanese printmaker.

9
Abdullah al-Qasemi, 89, Saudi Arabian writer and intellectual, cancer.
Moe Becker, 78, American basketball player.
Ronnie Bell, 88, British physical chemist.
Howie Braun, 83, American basketball player and coach.
Roger Freed, 49, American baseball player.
Félix González-Torres, 38, American artist, AIDS-related complications.
Metin Göktepe, 27, Turkish photojournalist, beaten to death.
M. Larry Lawrence, 69, American diplomat.
Walter M. Miller, 72, American fiction writer, suicide.
Fearless Nadia, 88, Australian-Indian actress and stuntwoman.
Sultan Rahi, 57, Pakistani actor, producer and screenwriter, ballistic trauma.
Özdemir Sabancı, 54, Turkish businessman, murdered.
Jack Smith, 79, American journalist, author, and newspaper columnist.
Mike Synar, 45, American politician, brain cancer.
Louis William Tordella, 84, American mathematician and deputy director of the National Security Agency.
Danni Xtravaganza, 34, American member of the ballroom scene, AIDS-related complications.

10
Ivan Deryugin, 67, Soviet/Russian modern pentathlete and Olympic champion.
Raymond H. Fogler, 103, American politician.
Dean McAdams, 78, American gridiron football player.
Egidio Ortona, 85, Italian diplomat.
Don Richardson, 77, American television director (Lost in Space, The Adventures of Ellery Queen, Bonanza).
Joseph Charles Schultz Jr., 77, American baseball player, manager, and coach.

11
Harold Walter Bailey, 96, British scholar of Asian languages.
Tato Bores, 70, Argentine actor.
Roger Crozier, 53, Canadian ice hockey player, cancer.
Eric Hebborn, 61, English painter, draughtsman, art forger and author, homicide.
Ike Isaacs, 76, Burmese-English jazz guitarist.

12
Eduard Haken, 85, Czech actor, doctor and opera singer.
Edmund Happold, 65, British engineer and activist.
Jonas Jonsson, 92, Swedish sport shooter.
Joseph Kuzmin, 85, Russian politician.
Jon Pattis, American engineer imprisoned in Iran, congestive heart failure.
John Howard Purnell, 70, Welsh chemist.
Fouad Sedki, 70, Egyptian football player.
Bartel Leendert van der Waerden, 92, Dutch mathematician and mathematics historian.
Dai Ward, 61, Welsh football player.

13
Denise Grey, 99, Italian-French actress.
Mark Herron, 67, American actor, cancer.
Dean Kelley, 64, American basketball player.
Ester Krumbachová, 72, Czech filmmaker.
Bobby Langton, 77, English football player and manager.
Aliou Mahamidou, 48, Nigerien politician and Prime Minister.
Sam Merwin, Jr., 85, American writer.
Elina Pohjanpää, 62, Finnish actress, oral cancer.
Jorge Sapelli, 70, Uruguayan politician.

14
Annie Broadbent, 87, British artistic gymnast.
Umberto Drei, 70, Italian racing cyclist.
Jacques Lebrun, 85, French sailor.
Onno Tunç, 47, Turkish composer, plane crash.

15
Les Baxter, 73, American musician, singer, and composer.
Richard Cobb, 78, British historian, essayist, and professor.
Gerhard Huttula, 93, German cinematographer and film director.
Moshoeshoe II of Lesotho, 57, King of Lesotho, traffic collision.
Edward Makula, 65, Polish aviator.
Mohsin Naqvi, 48, Pakistani poet, murdered.
Max Varnel, 70, French film director.
Rudolf Wanderone, 82, American pool player.

16
Marcia Davenport, 92, American author and music critic.
Richard Kermode, 49, American keyboardist.
Harry Potts, 75, English football player and manager.
Kurt Svanström, 80, Swedish football player.

17
Arnold Anderson, 83, New Zealand sprinter.
Barbara Jordan, 59, American politician, pneumonia.
Charles Madge, 83, English poet, journalist and sociologist.
Harry Robertson, 63, Scottish musician, bandleader, and composer.
Juan Luis Segundo, 70, Uruguayan priest and theologian.
Xuefan Zhu, 90, Chinese politician.

18
Osro Cobb, 91, American lawyer and politician.
Leonor Fini, 87, Argentine painter, designer and writer.
John Hope, 1st Baron Glendevon, 83, British politician.
N. T. Rama Rao, 72, Indian actor, producer, director, and politician, heart attack.
Alberto Ruschel, 77, Brazilian actor, producer, and director.

19
Upendranath Ashk, 85, Indian novelist, short story writer and playwright.
Bernard Baily, 79, American comic book artist.
Kasım Gülek, 91, Turkish politician.
Byron Keith, 78, American actor (77 Sunset Strip, Batman, The Stranger), heart attack.
Anton Myrer, 73, American author, leukemia.
Donny Schmit, 29, American motorcycle racer, aplastic anemia.
Don Simpson, 52, American film producer (Top Gun, Beverly Hills Cop, The Rock), heart failure.
Lucien Theys, 68, Belgian long-distance and steeplechase runner.
Harold Wolpe, 70, South African political economist.

20
Buster Benton, 63, American blues guitarist and singer, diabetes.
Tom Dimitroff, Sr., 60, American and Canadian football player and coach.
Sidney Korshak, 88, American lawyer and "fixer" for the Chicago Mafia.
Joseph Mermans, 73, Belgian football player.
Gerry Mulligan, 68, American jazz baritone saxophonist, arranger and composer, liver cancer.
Lo Wei, 77, Chinese film director, heart failure.

21
Jordan Christopher, 55, American actor (Secrets of Midland Heights) and singer.
Roman Cieślewicz, 66, Polish artist, laryngeal cancer.
Herbert McEver, 89, American sportsman and coach.
Peter Stadlen, 85, British pianist.
Henry Serrano Villard, 95, American diplomat and author, pneumonia.

22
William Cantrell, 87, American powerboat and racecar driver.
Israel Eldad, 85, Israeli philosopher.
Dick Rand, 64, American baseball player.
Petro Shelest, 87, Soviet/Ukrainian politician.

23
Cliff Griffith, 79, American racecar driver.
Norman MacCaig, 85, Scottish poet and teacher.
Richard Sakakida, 75, American intelligence agent.
Horst Wende, 76, German musician.
Art White, 80, American gridiron football player.

24
Jimmy Davidson, 70, Scottish football player.
Sándor Iharos, 65, Hungarian long-distance runner.
Tom Tracy, 61, American gridiron football player.
Wim Umboh, 62, Indonesian film director.
Seigo Yamaguchi, 71, Japanese aikido instructor and Aikikai teacher.

25
Billy Bailey, 49, American murderer, execution by hanging.
Ruth Berghaus, 68, German stage director of opera, cancer.
Antonio Buenaventura, 91, Filipino composer and musician.
Ángel García, 76, Cuban sprinter.
Jack Haden, 81, American gridiron football player.
Mian Shaukat Hussain, 67, Pakistani tabla player.
Jonathan Larson, 35, American composer and playwright (Rent, Tick, Tick... Boom!), aortic dissection.
Yuri Levitansky, 74, Russian poet and writer.

26
Gerrit Cornelis Berkouwer, 92, Dutch theologian.
Harold Brodkey, 65, American short-story writer and novelist, AIDS-related complications.
Saul Goodman, 88, American timpanist.
Yawara Hata, 85, Japanese politician and lawyer.
Frank Howard, 86, American gridiron football player and coach.
Charles Jewtraw, 95, American speed skater.
Jiří Kotalík, 75, Czech art historian and gallery director.
Henry Lewis, 63, American conductor, heart attack.
Georg Alexander, Duke of Mecklenburg, 74, German noble.
Bob Pastor, 82, American boxer.
Allan Robert Phillips, 81, American ornithologist, cancer.
Stevie Plunder, 32, Australian guitarist and singer-songwriter, suicide.
Dave Schultz, 36, American wrestler and murder victim, shot.
Hormasji Maneckji Seervai, 89, Indian lawyer.
John Albert Taylor, 36, American murderer, execution by firing squad.
Dimitri Zaitz, 78, American shot putter.

27
Olga Havlová, 62, Czech activist and first wife of president Václav Havel, cancer.
Vyacheslav Lemeshev, 43, Olympic boxer.
Patrick Ludlow, 92, British actor.
Thomas Mitchell, 93, English cricket player.
Vsevolod Sanayev, 83, Russian/Soviet actor.
Barbara Skelton, 79, English memoirist, novelist and socialite.
Ralph Yarborough, 92, American politician and lawyer.

28
Dev Kant Baruah, 81, Indian politician.
Joseph Brodsky, 55, Russian-American poet, heart attack.
Burne Hogarth, 84, American cartoonist.
Piero Palermini, 70, Italian actor.
Jerry Siegel, 81, American comic book artist, co-creator of Superman, heart attack.
Geo Widengren, 88, Swedish historian and academic.
San Yu, 77, Burmese general, politician, and president of Myanmar.

29
Julius Posener, 91, German architectural historian and author.
Terence Reese, 82, British bridge player and writer.
Bill Sorensen, New Zealand rugby player, coach and administrator.
Jamie Uys, 74, South African film director, film producer, and screenwriter, heart attack.

30
Friedrich Benfer, 90, German actor.
Guy Doleman, 72, New Zealand actor (Thunderball, The Ipcress File, Funeral in Berlin), lung cancer.
Gino Gallagher, 33, Irish republican and member of the Irish National Liberation Army, shot.
Bob Thiele, 73, American record producer and music executive, kidney failure.

31
E. C. L. During Caspers, 61, Dutch archaeologist.
Olle Hallberg, 92, Swedish long jumper and Olympian.
Rufus G. Herring, 74, United States Navy Medal of Honor recipient.
Wolf Karni, 84, Finnish football referee.
Gustave Solomon, 65, American mathematician and electrical engineer.

References 

1996-01
 01